Denilson Alves Borges  (born 23 March 2001), simply known as Denilson, is a Brazilian footballer who plays as a midfielder for Cuiabá.

Club career
Born in Nazaré do Piauí, Piauí, Denilson joined Flamengo's youth setup in 2018, from Itapirense. He left the club in the end of 2019, and subsequently joined Atlético Mineiro.

In June 2021, Denilson moved to Bangu in the Série D. He made his senior debut on 5 June by starting in a 2–1 home loss against Santo André, and scored his first goal on 31 July in a 1–1 draw at Portuguesa.

On 18 October 2021, Denilson renewed his contract with Bangu until 2025. The following 14 March, he was loaned to Série A side Cuiabá until April 2023.

Denilson made his top tier debut on 7 August 2022, coming on as a late substitute for Rafael Gava in a 1–0 away loss against Fluminense. On 4 January of the following year, he signed a permanent five-year deal with Cuiabá, after the club paid R$ 320,000 for 60% of his economic rights.

Career statistics

References

2001 births
Living people
Sportspeople from Piauí
Brazilian footballers
Association football midfielders
Campeonato Brasileiro Série A players
Campeonato Brasileiro Série D players
Bangu Atlético Clube players
Cuiabá Esporte Clube players